Sterculia parviflora is a species of plant in the family Malvaceae. It is found in India, Indonesia, Malaysia, and Singapore.

References

parviflora
Least concern plants
Taxonomy articles created by Polbot